Westervoort is a railway station in the eastern Netherlands, in the town of Westervoort. The station is situated on the Oberhausen–Arnhem railway. Train services are operated by Arriva and Breng. The original station was opened in 1856 and closed in 1936. The new station opened on 11 December 2011. There used to be another station in Westervoort called Fort Westervoort (from 1890 to 1918). The station ran directly through the middle area of the fort ("castle"). Not much of the castle remains. There was also a station on the other side of the bridge called Oostzijde Brug.

Train services

Bus services

References

External links

NS website 
Dutch Public Transport journey planner 

Railway stations in Gelderland
Railway stations opened in 1856
Westervoort